Rev. Edward Bickersteth (19 March 1786 – 28 February 1850) was an English evangelical clergyman from the prominent Bickersteth family.

Life

He was born at Kirkby Lonsdale, Westmorland, the fourth son of Henry Bickersteth, a surgeon.  Bickersteth attended Kirby Longsdale Grammar School and practised as a solicitor at Norwich from 1812 to 1815.

Within space of only 11 days in December 1815 he was ordained both as a deacon and priest. In January 1816 travelled to Africa to inspect and report on the work of the Church Missionary Society (CMS). He continued to travel overseas in connection with the work of the CMS throughout his life. He was the secretary of the CMS from 1824 to 1831.

On receiving the living of Watton, Hertfordshire, in 1830, he resigned his secretaryship, but continued to lecture and preach, both for the Church Missionary Society and the Society for the Conversion of the Jews. He was instrumental in the merger of the Anglican Central Committee and the Continental society in 1840 to form the Foreign Aid Society which supported evangelical Protestant ministry on the continent of Europe.

Bickersteth met Anthony Ashley-Cooper, 7th Earl of Shaftesbury in 1835. The Earl made a visit  of several days to Watton Rectory in the summer 1836. Following this visit the pair became the best of friends with Bickersteth becoming one of the great reformers closest advisers.

He was active in promoting the Evangelical Alliance of 1845, strongly opposed the Tractarian Movement, and was one of the founders of the 1849 created Irish Church Missions, and also of the 1841 created Parker Society, societies.

Works

His works include A Scripture Help (London, 1816), which has been translated into many European languages, and Christian Psalmody (London, 1833), a collection of over 700 hymns, which forms the basis of the Hymnal Companion (London, 1870), compiled by his son, Edward Henry Bickersteth, bishop of Exeter (1885–1890).

Family
Bickersteth was the brother of Henry, Baron Langdale, Master of the Rolls (1836–1851), and uncle of Robert Bickersteth, Bishop of Ripon (1857–1884).

His wife Sarah, whom Bickersteth married in 1812, was the eldest daughter of Thomas Bignold of Norwich, together they had six children. Edward Henry Bickersteth (1825-1906) Bishop of Exeter was his only son and Edward Bickersteth, founder of the Cambridge Mission to Delhi and later bishop of South Tokyo, his grandson.

Edward Bickersteth, Dean of Lichfield, was his nephew.

References

Attribution

Sources
Revd T.R. Birks, New York, 1851

1786 births
1850 deaths
19th-century English Anglican priests
Edward
English solicitors
19th-century English lawyers